Zong Qinghou (Chinese:宗庆后; born 1945) is a Chinese billionaire businessman, and the founder, chairman and CEO of the Hangzhou Wahaha Group, China's leading beverage company. As of March 2022, his net worth was estimated at US$8.7 billion.

Biography
Zong is a native of Zhejiang, and had little formal education. After graduating from secondary school, Zong worked at the Zhoushan salt farm. He returned home in 1979 on the retirement of his mother, who was a school teacher. He eventually returned to Hangzhou, and only found menial work at a local school due to the low level of his education. In 1987, he targeted a minigrocery in a school in Shangcheng District, Hangzhou, selling milk. Zong headed the embryonic Wahaha business, which distributed fizzy soft drinks, ice and stationery. Together with two retired schoolteachers, he borrowed the sum of CNY 140,000, to start producing milk drinks for distribution.

He obtained independence from an early government partner by stressing his links with Danone. With his autocratic style and workaholic ethic, he built Wahaha into the largest beverage manufacturer in the People's Republic of China.

The WHH joint venture entered into with Groupe Danone involved the inward investment of US$70 million in five joint venture companies in exchange for 51% Groupe Danone ownership in each company. The trademark agreement signed on 29 February 1996 gave the JVs the exclusive rights of production, distribution and sales of products under the Wahaha brand. Collaboration has grown into 39 joint venture entities by 2007.

In 2007, the relationship turned sour. Danone had accused Wahaha of "secretly operating a set of parallel companies that mirrored the joint venture’s operations with virtually identical products and siphoned off as much as $100 million from the partnership." Danone and Wahaha reached a settlement and dissolved their partnership. Zong resigned as Chairman of the joint ventures on 5 June 2007.

Forbes named Zong as China's richest man in 2010. He was ranked as China's richest man in 2012 and second-richest in 2013, according to the China Rich List, published by Hurun Report.

Personal
Zong has served as a delegate to the Chinese National People's Congress since 2002. He was re-elected in 2007.

He is married to Shi Youzhen (施幼珍), and they have one child, a daughter, Fuli (Kelly) Zong (宗馥莉). Shi is purchasing manager at Wahaha. Zong formerly held permanent resident status in the United States, which he obtained to make it easier for him to travel to the country and look after his investments there. His daughter attended Pepperdine University in Southern California and naturalized as a U.S. citizen, but later moved back to China and in 2007 began the procedure to renounce her U.S. citizenship. Zong gained wide support as he played the role of "David" against a French "Goliath" gobbling up Chinese companies. However, with the revelation of his green card in 2008, public perceptions changed and his reputation suffered. In 2013, he stated that because he did not re-enter the U.S. for several years, his status was thus deemed abandoned.

Tax evasion allegations
Zong claimed to have been paid a salary of 3,000 EUR and 100,000 EUR annual allowances plus a bonus worth 1% of the annual profit of the joint ventures, totaling 70 million yuan of income every year.

Caijing reported in April 2008 that Zong was being investigated for allegedly evading taxes amounting to some ¥ 300 million. An investigator had alleged that Zong "...earned far more than this and hasn't fully reported the tax for years". Caijing implied there may have been less than transparent payments through web of Hong Kong-registered accounts of Zong, Shi, daughter Fuli; and the former Party secretary of Wahaha, Du Jianying. Zong had apparently paid more than 200 million yuan in back taxes in October 2007, after the investigation kicked off. However, the magazine suspected Zong still owed millions more.

Honorary titles
List of titles:

 National Excellent Entrepreneur
 National Excellent Manager
 Model of Patriotism to Support the Armed Forces
 Outstanding Builder of Socialism with Chinese Characteristics
 The First Chinese Entrepreneurs Entrepreneurship Prize

References

1945 births
Living people
Hangzhou Wahaha Group people
Businesspeople from Hangzhou
Businesspeople in the drink industry
Chinese chief executives
Delegates to the 12th National People's Congress
Delegates to the 11th National People's Congress
Delegates to the 10th National People's Congress
Billionaires from Zhejiang
Politicians from Hangzhou
People's Republic of China politicians from Zhejiang
20th-century Chinese businesspeople
21st-century Chinese businesspeople
Chinese company founders
Chinese food industry businesspeople